Hyalogyra is a genus of sea snails, marine gastropod mollusks in the family Hyalogyrinidae.

Species
Species within the genus Hyalogyra include:
 Hyalogyra expansa B. A. Marshall, 1988
 Hyalogyra necrophaga Rubio, Rolán & Femándes, 1992
 Hyalogyra vitrinelloides Warén & Bouchet, 1993
 Hyalogyra zibrowii Warén in Warén, Carrozza & Rocchini, 1997

References

 Gofas, S.; Le Renard, J.; Bouchet, P. (2001). Mollusca, in: Costello, M.J. et al. (Ed.) (2001). European register of marine species: a check-list of the marine species in Europe and a bibliography of guides to their identification. Collection Patrimoines Naturels, 50: pp. 180–213
 Warén A. & Bouchet P. (1993) New records, species, genera, and a new family of gastropods from hydrothermal vents and hydrocarbon seeps. Zoologica Scripta 22

External links
 Marshall, B. A. (1988). Skeneidae, Vitrinellidae and Orbitestellidae (Mollusca: Gastropoda) associated with biogenic substrata from bathyal depths off New Zealand and New South Wales. Journal of Natural History. 22(4): 949-1004